Ziebarth is a surname. Notable people with the surname include:

Earl Ziebarth (born 1963), American politician
E. W. Ziebarth (1910–2001), American radio broadcaster, professor, and academic administrator
Wayne W. Ziebarth (1921-2019) American statesman, WWII Marine, and farmer